Michelle Rejwan (born March 8, 1982) is an American film producer and the Senior Vice-President of Live Action Development and Production for Lucasfilm. She produced the Star Wars film The Rise of Skywalker, alongside Kathleen Kennedy and J. J. Abrams.

Biography 
Rejwan went to University of California, Los Angeles for a year, transferred to University of Southern California, before deciding to take a leave of absence. She got a job as assistant to Allison Jones. She later became an assistant to Jeff Garlin. After a stint in the film industry, Rejwan returned to school graduated from Columbia University School of General Studies in 2008.

After Columbia, Rejwan landed a job as J. J. Abrams' assistant and rose to associate producer on Super 8 and co-produced Star Wars: The Force Awakens and Star Wars: The Rise of Skywalker. In 2019, she was named Senior Vice President of Live Action Development and Production of Lucasfilm, where she has been a member of the Star Wars "brain trust" since 2015. Rejwan served as executive producer for the Disney+ series Obi-Wan Kenobi, Andor, and Willow.

In October 2022, it was reported that Rejwan had stepped down from her role of Senior Vice President for Live Action Development & Production at Lucasfilm, though she was not leaving Lucasfilm entirely. Rejwan remains at Lucasfilm in a full-time producer capacity.

Filmography

Film

Television

References

External links

American women film producers
Living people
1982 births
Columbia University School of General Studies alumni
21st-century American women
Lucasfilm people